At the end of each regular season, the Atlantic 10 Conference names major award winners in baseball.  It currently names a Coach, Pitcher, Player, and Rookie of the Year.  The Coach of the Year, dating to 1988, is the oldest.  Pitcher and Player were added in 1993, Rookie in 1994.

Through the end of 2014, Rhode Island has won the most major awards, with 12.  The only other school to win more than ten is George Washington, with 11.

Three players have won more than one of the awards.  In 2000, George Washington's Greg Conden was named both Rookie and Pitcher of the Year. Duquesne's B. J. Barns was Rookie of the Year in 1997 and Player of the Year in 1999; Rhode Island's Dan Batz did the same in 2001 and 2004.

Coach of the Year
The Coach of the Year award is presented annually to the conference's most outstanding coach, as voted by the A-10's coaches at the end of each regular season.  The award has been presented since 1988.

In 2014, Saint Joseph's head coach Fritz Hamburg received the award for the first time.  After tying for 8th and missing the conference tournament in 2013, the Hawks went 35-16 (18-8 A-10) in 2014, setting a program wins record.

Mike Stone of UMass and Fred Hill of Rutgers have each won the award three times, a conference record.  Both coaches won their awards in consecutive seasons, Stone from 1994–1996 and Hill from 1991–1993.  Only one other coach, Rhode Island's Frank Leoni from 2003–2004, has won the award in consecutive years.

George Washington is the only school to have three coaches win the award. The Colonials' John Castleberry won it in 1989, Tom Walter in 1998, and Gregg Ritchie in 2013.  Three other schools have had two coaches earn the honor: Xavier (John Morrey in 1997 and Scott Googins in 2008), La Salle (Larry Conti in 1999 and Mike Lake in 2010), and Rhode Island (Frank Leoni in 2003 and 2004 and Jim Foster in 2011).

Winners by school

By school
The following is a table of the schools whose coaches have won the award, along with the year each school joined the conference, the number of times it has won the award, and the years in which it has done so.

Pitcher of the Year

The conference's Pitcher of the Year award is given annually to the best pitcher in the Atlantic 10, as voted by the conference's coaches at the end of the regular season. It was first presented in 1993.

In 2014, Saint Joseph's Jordan Carter received the award.  On the regular season, the senior had 10 wins, a 2.19 ERA, and 75 strikeouts.  He was selected by the Cleveland Indians in the 22nd round of the 2014 MLB Draft.

Richmond's Tim Stauffer is the only pitcher to win the award twice. He won it in 2002 and 2003. Stauffer and 1993 winner Steve Kline went on to play in Major League Baseball.

Winners by season
Below is a table of the award's winners since it was first presented in 1993.

By school
The following is a table of the schools whose pitchers have won the award, along with the year each school joined the conference, the number of times it has won the award, and the years in which it has done so.

Player of the Year
The conference's Player of the Year award is given annually to the best position player in the A-10, as chosen by the conference's coaches at the end of the regular season.  It was first presented in 1993.

In 2014, Saint Joseph's outfielder Collin Forgey won the award. In the regular season, he hit .368 and slugged .561 for the Hawks.  Two players have won the award twice: Fordham's Bobby Kingsbury in 2001 and 2002 and St. Bonaventure's Brian Pellegrini in 2006 and 2007. Kingsbury and 1996 recipient Kevin Barker later played in Major League Baseball.

Winners by season
Below is a table of the award's winners since it was first presented in 1993.

By school
The following is a table of the schools whose players have won the award, along with the year each school joined the conference, the number of times it has won the award, and the years in which it has done so.

In 2014, Massachusetts pitcher/designated hitter Mike Geannelis won the award. During the summer, he played for the Nashua Silver Knights of the Futures Collegiate Baseball League.

Rookie of the Year
The Rookie of the Year award is annually presented to the conference's best freshman, as chosen by the league's coaches at the end of the season. It was first presented in 1994. Both pitchers and position players are eligible.

Winners by season
Below is a table of the award's winners since it was first presented in 1994.

By school
The following is a table of the schools whose players have won the award, along with the year each school joined the conference, the number of times it has won the award, and the years in which it has done so.

References

Atlantic 10 Conference baseball
College baseball conference trophies and awards in the United States
NCAA Division I baseball conference coaches of the year
NCAA Division I baseball conference players of the year
NCAA Division I baseball conference freshmen of the year